Hallypop is a digital entertainment channel owned by Jungo TV in partnership with Cinedigm, based in the United States. The channel airs programming content from Seoul Broadcasting System (SBS) which focuses on Korean variety shows, music, dramas and live concerts.

Programming
The channel primarily airs content outsourced from SBS, including reality (Running Man), music variety (Music Bank, K-pop Star, and JYP’s Party People), drama and lifestyle.

International versions
A Philippine version of the channel was launched in 2020 by GMA Network after GMA signed a partnership with Jungo TV in 2019. It will air in September 20, 2020 as part of its channel lineup on GMA Affordabox digital set-top-box and GMA Now along with GMA, GTV, Heart of Asia and I Heart Movies.

References

Television channels and stations established in 2018
Television networks in the United States
Korean-language television stations